Tatiana P. Grigorieva  (Russian: Григорьева, Татьяна Петровна, Japanese: グリゴーリエワ, テー・ペー; born Tatiana P. Topekha) was an outstanding Russian Japanologist, essayist, influential thinker, intellectual, translator (from Japanese to Russian), editor, and prominent Russian academic. She is best known as a researcher of Japanese culture, comparative literature scholar, a translator from Japanese into Russian, and an organizer of Russian humanities, who, beside of academic career, put considerable effort in popularization of Japanese culture, aesthetics and literature in Russia. She managed to produce academic works, which not only inspired a lively discussion in academia, but also became widely popular amongst intelligentsia.

Her books helped to transform, in minds of Soviet and Russian intelligentsia, the image of Japanese and Chinese cultures from exotic "orientalist flower" into a living and powerful tradition. In the late Soviet period, when most "ideological" texts were still dominated by dry pseudo-Marxist dogmatism, her brilliantly written academic monographs and translations were among a few bright intellectual beacons that helped many people to overcome pessimism and spiritual depression. 
Later in her life, as an original thinker, she had striven to create a humanistic, holistic synthesis of Eastern and Western philosophical paradigms (symbolized by Chinese Dao (Tao) and Judeo-Christian Logos).

Life and career
Grigorieva was born in the family of a prominent Soviet Japanologist, specialist in Japanese labor movement, Petr P. Topekha (Russian: Топеха Петр Павлович). Later, the family moved to Moscow, and she graduated with the Specialist Degree from Moscow Institute of Oriental Studies, in 1952. Grigorieva has studied at the graduate school in the Institute of Oriental Languages until 1957, and got a research fellow position in the Institute of Oriental Studies of the Russian Academy of Sciences, since 1958.

In 1980, she defended a second academic degree (the highest in Soviet academia), of Doctor of Sciences Doktor nauk in Philology, with the dissertation, based on her monograph "Japanese art tradition".

Later, she received the title of "Professor".

She advanced to the position of leading research fellow (1988-1998), and later to the head research fellow (1998-2012) at the Department of Comparative Study of Cultures. She served as the head research fellow emeritus until her death (2012-2014).

Beside academic activity, she delivered a few major translations of Japanese literary works, and became a Member of Writers' Union of Russia.

She also served as a member of the Editorial Board of the "Foreign Literature" journal, as well as the chief editor of the Oriental Almanack.

She was awarded the title of "Distinguished Russian Scholar" 1997.

Academic activity
Grigorieva supervised dissertations of a few notable Russian Japanologists, e.g., Prof. Evgeny Steiner (https://soas.academia.edu/EvgenySteiner), http://www.hse.ru/data/2012/12/11/1247023902/CV%20HSE%202012.pdf), Prof. Vassili Molodiakov (http://en.jinf.jp/japanaward/h26list), etc.

Other activities
As a free thinker, Grigorieva was a member of the Independent Academy of Aesthetics and Free Arts ( Russian: Независимая Академия Эстетики и Свободных Искусств, http://www.independent-academy.net/). 
She also participated actively in the work of International Nicholas Roerich Center, where was the head of the section "Ideas of Russian Cosmism and Eastern teachings". She was the chief editor of two first volumes of works of the center.

Awards
  The Russian Academy of Sciences, Sergey F. Oldenburg's Award Sergey F. Oldenburg's Award, 2003, for a series of monographs on Japanese culture: "The Japanese Aesthetic Tradition", "The Japanese Literature in the 20th Century", "Dao and Logos: The Meeting of Cultures" (all in Russian)

Selected bibliography

Books
 Японская литература. Краткий очерк. — М., 1964 (в соавторстве) [Japanese Literature:ниу A Short Introduction (in Russian), Moscow, 1964] [url=http://iss.ndl.go.jp/books/R000000004-I969846-00?ar=4e1f |title=Japanese translation?]
 Куникида Доппо. Избранные рассказы /пер. с яп. Т. Топеха. - Москва: Гослитиздат, 1958.
 Одинокий странник: о японском писателе Куникида Доппо. — М., 1967. [Lonely Rambler: Life and Works of Japanese Writer Doppo Kunikida (in Russian), Moscow, 1967]
 Японская художественная традиция. — М., 1979. [The Japanese Aesthetic Tradition (in Russian), Moscow, 1979] 
 Японская литература XX века. — М., 1983.  [The Japanese Literature in the 20th Century (in Russian), Moscow, 1983] 
 Дао и Логос. Встреча культур. — М., 1992.  [Dao and Logos: The Meeting of Cultures (in Russian), Moscow, 1992] 
 Красотой Японии рожденный. — М., 1993.  ["Born by the Beauty of Japan" (in Russian), Moscow, 1993] 
 Движение красоты: Размышления о японской культуре. — М., 2005.  [The Flow of Beauty: Thoughts about Japanese Culture (in Russian), Moscow, 2005] 
 Япония. Путь сердца. — М., 2008.  [Japan: The Way of the Heart (in Russian), Moscow, 2008] 
 Китай, Россия и Всечеловек. — М.,"Новый Акрополь", 472 стр., 2010.  [China, Russia and The All-Embracing Human Being (in Russian), Moscow, 2010]

Articles
 И еще раз о Востоке и Западе // Иностранная литература. 1975. № 7 (пер. в Японии)
 Даосская и буддийская модели мира // Дао и даосизм в Китае. М., 1982
 Встреча с Гумбольдтом — встреча времен // Иностранная литература. 1987. № 8
 Образ мира в культуре // Культура, человек и картина мира. М., 1987

References

External links
 Grigorieva's WorldCat entry
 Biography in "Akademik Encyclopedia" (in Russian)
 Biography entry in A-Z Library (in Russian)
 Obituary on "Za Nauku!" (For Science!) site (in Russian)
 The Russian Academy of Sciences, Oldenburg's Award List
 Grigorieva's Essay on her Granddaughter (in Russian)
 Independent Academy's Obituary (in Russian
 Petr Topekha's WorldCat entry 
 Japanese Online Person Dictionary
 Japanese Person Link

1929 births
2014 deaths
Russian sinologists
Russian Japanologists
Russian women philosophers
20th-century Russian translators
Japanese literature academics
20th-century Russian philosophers
Women orientalists
20th-century Russian women writers
Moscow Institute of Oriental Studies alumni